Jerome Ford (born September 12, 1999) is an American football running back for the Cleveland Browns of the National Football League (NFL). He played college football at Alabama and Cincinnati.

High school career
Ford attended Armwood High School in Seffner, Florida. He committed to the University of Alabama to play college football.

College career
Ford played at Alabama in 2018 and 2019. Over the two years he rushed for 151 yards on 31 carries with three touchdowns. In 2020, he transferred to the University of Cincinnati. During his first year at Cincinnati in 2020, he played in 10 games as the backup to Gerrid Doaks, rushing for 483 yards on 73 carries with eight touchdowns. In 2021, he became the team's starter.

Statistics

Professional career

Ford was selected by the Cleveland Browns in the fifth round, 156th overall, of the 2022 NFL Draft. He suffered an ankle injury in Week 4 and was placed on injured reserve on October 4, 2022. He was activated from injured reserve on November 12, 2022.

References

External links
 Cleveland Browns bio
 Alabama Crimson Tide bio
Cincinnati Bearcats bio

1999 births
Living people
Players of American football from Tampa, Florida
American football running backs
Alabama Crimson Tide football players
Cincinnati Bearcats football players
Cleveland Browns players